Turkey competed at the 2011 Winter Universiade in Erzurum, Turkey.

Competitors

Alpine skiing

Women

Super-G
Saturday, January 29, 11:00

Biathlon

Men

20 km individual
Saturday, January 29, 10:00

10 km sprint
Tuesday, February 1, 10:00

12.5 km pursuit
Wednesday, February 2, 10:00

15 km mass start
Saturday, February 5, 10:00

Women

15 km individual
Saturday, January 29, 13:00

7.5 km sprint
Tuesday, February 1, 14:00

10 km pursuit
Wednesday, February 2, 12:00

Mixed event

2x6 km + 2x7.5 km relay
Fridayday, February 4, 10:00

Cross-country skiing

Men

10 km classical
Friday, January 28, 12:00

15 km classical/free pursuit
Monday, January 31, 12:00

30 km free mass start
Saturday, February 5, 11:30

4x10 km classical/free relay
Wednesday, February 2, 10:00

1.6 km free sprint
Saturday, January 29, 10:45

Women

5 km classical
Friday, January 28, 10:00

10 km classical/free pursuit
Monday, January 31, 10:00

15 km free mass start
Saturday, February 5, 10:00

1.3 km free sprint
Saturday, January 29, 12:30

Mixed event

6x1.3 km free sprint
Thursday, February 3, 10:00

Curling

Turkey will be represented by a men's and a women's curling team.

Men

Standings

Round-robin results

Draw 1
Friday, January 28, 14:00

Draw 2
Saturday, January 29, 9:00

Draw 3
Saturday, January 29, 19:00

Draw 4
Sunday, January 30, 14:00

Draw 5
Monday, January 31, 9:00

Draw 6
Monday, January 31, 19:00

Draw 7
Tuesday, February 1, 14:00

Draw 8
Wednesday, February 2, 9:00

Draw 9
Wednesday, February 2, 19:00

Women

Standings

Round-robin results

Draw 1
Friday, January 28, 9:00

Draw 2
Friday, January 28, 19:00
Saturday, January 29, 9:00

Draw 3
Saturday, January 29, 14:00

Draw 4
Sunday, January 30, 9:00

Draw 5
Sunday, January 30, 19:00

Draw 6
Monday, January 31, 14:00

Draw 7
Tuesday, February 1, 9:00

Draw 8
Tuesday, February 1, 19:00

Draw 9
Wednesday, February 2, 14:00

Figure skating

Men's singles
Wednesday, February 2, 15:00

Ladies' singles
Monday, January 31, 18:55

Synchronized skating
Friday, February 4, 19:50

Freestyle skiing

Men

Moguls
Friday, January 28, 11:30

Ski cross
Saturday, February 5, 11:30

Women

Moguls
Friday, January 28, 11:30

Ski cross
Saturday, February 5, 12:44

Ice hockey

Turkey will be represented by a men's and women's team.

Men
The men's hockey team competed in Group A. It finished the round robin as the latest conceding 60 goals without scoring a goal at all. The team finally placed twelfth after playing two more matches. The only goals for Turkey's team in the Games came in the play-offs from Emre Elevli against Slovenia and from Kemal Burkay Altuntaş against South Korea.

Team roster
Head coach:  Tarık Göçmen

Group A – round-robin results

9th–12th placement matches

11th-place match

Women

Team Roster
Head coach:  Keith McAdams

Round-robin results

Nordic combined

Men

Individual Gundersen
Cross country 10 km
Friday, January 28, 10:00

K95 Jump
Saturday, January 29, 10:00

Mass start
Cross country 10 km
Sunday, January 30, 09:30

K95 Jump
Sunday, January 30, 15:45

Short track speed skating

Men

500 m
Saturday, January 29, 14:48

1000 m
Sunday, January 30, 16:15

1500 m
Friday, January 28, 14:50

Women

500 m
Saturday, January 29, 14:00

1000 m
Sunday, January 30, 14:00

1500 m
Friday, January 28, 14:00

Ski jumping

Men

Normal hill individual
Saturday, January 29, 18:00

Large hill individual
Monday, January 31, 19:30

Snowboarding

Men

SBX
Saturday, January 29, 11:00

Women

SBX
Saturday, January 29, 14:45

References

External links
Erzurum 2011 Main Site

Nations at the 2011 Winter Universiade
2011
2011 in Turkish sport